Begdale is a hamlet between Wisbech, Elm and Friday Bridge in Cambridgeshire, England.

References

Hamlets in Cambridgeshire
Fenland District